Group 2 of the 1958 FIFA World Cup took place from 8 to 15 June 1958. The group consisted of France, Paraguay, Scotland, and Yugoslavia.

Standings

 France finished ahead of Yugoslavia on goal average

Matches
All times listed are local time.

France vs Paraguay

Yugoslavia vs Scotland

Yugoslavia vs France

Paraguay vs Scotland

France vs Scotland

Paraguay vs Yugoslavia

References

External links
 1958 FIFA World Cup archive

1958 FIFA World Cup
France at the 1958 FIFA World Cup
Yugoslavia at the 1958 FIFA World Cup
Scotland at the 1958 FIFA World Cup
Paraguay at the 1958 FIFA World Cup